U. Thaniyarasu is politician and, was a Member of the Tamil Nadu Legislative Assembly from the Paramathi Velur constituency. He represents the alliance with AIADMK.

Since May 2016, he has been a Member of the Tamil Nadu Legislative Assembly from the Kangayam constituency.

References 

Living people
Year of birth missing (living people)
Tamil Nadu MLAs 2011–2016
Tamil Nadu MLAs 2016–2021